Moses Arita (born 30 November 1991) is a Kenyan footballer who currently plays for Western Stima Football Club in the Kenyan Premier League and the Kenya national team as a striker.

Career

Early career
Arita was born and raised in Nakuru, where he attended Mama Ngina Primary School, he then went to Manor High School in Rift Valley. After completing high school he joined St. Andrews Turi in Molo in 2008 before moving to Kenyan Premier League side Sony Sugar FC in 2009.

Thika United
After one season at Sony Sugar, Arita joined Thika United in 2010, where he became an instrumental player in the starting lineup, but it was not until 2011 that he burst into the limelight with his goal-poaching abilities that saw him net 10 goals in 21 games.

KF Tirana
Following a recommendation from fellow Kenyan and new KF Tirana signing James Situma, Arita signed a three-year contract with Albania's most successful club in August 2011. He moved to KF Tirana on a free transfer from Thika United on the grounds that the Kenyan club will receive 5% of the players next transfer fee.

Return to Thika United
After a rather unsuccessful season at KF Tirana, Arita returned to Thika United for the 2012 Kenyan Premier League. He made a decision to remain in Kenya after he returned there following visa complications experienced in Albania. He finished the season as his club's second top scorer with 6 goals, behind leader Kepha Aswani, who finished the season as the league's third top scorer with 12 goals.

Tusker
Arita's success at Thika in 2012 led league champions Tusker and former champions Sofapaka into a race for his signature. After much speculation, Arita finally signed for the former in late December 2012.

References

External links
 
 

1993 births
Living people
Alumni of St. Andrews School, Turi
Kenyan footballers
Association football forwards
SoNy Sugar F.C. players
Thika United F.C. players
KF Tirana players
Tusker F.C. players
Ushuru F.C. players
Muhoroni Youth F.C. players
Kategoria Superiore players
Kenya international footballers
Kenyan expatriate footballers
Kenyan expatriate sportspeople in Albania
Expatriate footballers in Albania
People from Nakuru